Nesse-Apfelstädt is a municipality in the district of Gotha, in Thuringia, Germany. It was formed by the merger of the previously independent municipalities Apfelstädt, Gamstädt, Ingersleben and Neudietendorf, on 1 December 2009.

Villages 

The municipality Nesse-Apfelstädt consists of the following six villages:
 Apfelstädt
 Gamstädt
 Ingersleben
 Kleinrettbach
 Kornhochheim
 Neudietendorf

References 

Gotha (district)
Saxe-Coburg and Gotha